Norma is an unincorporated community located within Pittsgrove Township in Salem County, New Jersey, United States. Norma is located at the junction of County Routes 540 and 638, west of Vineland. Norma has a post office with ZIP code 08347, which opened on June 29, 1888.

References

Pittsgrove Township, New Jersey
Unincorporated communities in Salem County, New Jersey
Unincorporated communities in New Jersey